The Badger Hollow Solar Farm is a 300 MW solar photovoltaic energy station currently in construction in Iowa County in southwestern, Wisconsin. Ownership is shared between Wisconsin Public Service Corporation (WPS), Madison Gas and Electric (MG&E), and Wisconsin Electric Power Company (WE Energies), with each utility owning 100 MW. It was the second utility-scale solar plant approved and constructed in Wisconsin

Once completed, the site will cover approximately 3500 acres, with between 2000 and 2200 acres used directly for the solar panel arrays. The facility is located in the Village of Cobb and in the towns of Mifflin, Eden, and Linden. It is located just south of Cobb and southeast of the nearby Montfort Wind Farm.

On April 18, 2019, WPS and MG&E purchased and acquired 150 MW of the Badger Hollow solar farm and the electrical tie in line for approximately $389.7 million. This purchase also included the acquisition of the 150 MW Two Creeks Solar Park. The total cost for this agreement was $1,299 per KW, or $194.8 million for the Badger Hollow component. In March, 2020, WE Energies and MG&E purchased and acquired the remaining 150 MW of the solar farm for approximately $194.9 million.

As part of project application materials, the facility was expected to require 17 full-time staff once constructed. The facility is eligible for the Federal Solar Investment Tax Credit (ITC). MG&E assumed that the facility would receive 30% of the ITC. The ITC would be normalized over the 30 year life of the project as required by the IRS.

Background 
Through an executive order, Governor Tony Evers charged the Office of Sustainability and Clean Energy to achieve a goal that all electricity consumed in Wisconsin by 2050 be 100% carbon-free. According to analysis conducted by the International Panel on Climate Change, the lifecycle emissions of electricity generated by utility-scale solar facilities is 48 gCO2eq/kWh (median value). By comparison, lifecycle emissions from electricity generated from coal and natural gas (combined-cycle plants) are 820 and 490 gCO2eq/kWh, respectively. 

The procurement and construction of utility-scale solar has also been justified by some in Wisconsin due to electrical generation supply concerns when several large coal-fired plants in the state will be closed in the early 2020s. Those coal-fired plant closures have since been delayed to the mid 2020s with major utility companies citing electricity reliability concerns and the delay in rolling out new solar farms.

History 
Badger Hollow Solar Farm, LLC, an affiliate of Invenergy, LLC, submitted a Certificate of Public Convenience and Necessity (CPCN) application to the Public Services Commission of Wisconsin (PSC) on June 1, 2018. On April 18, 2019, the CPCN application to construct the facility was approved by the PSC. In its approval ruling, the PSC found that the project satisfied the requirements of Wisconsin Statute § 1.12 and 196.025(1), known as the Energy Priorities Law.

Major components of Badger Hollow include the PV panels, power conversion units (PCUs), collection lines, a collector substation, and an operations and maintenance (O&M) building. 

 Panels: The facility will consist of approximately 900,000 to 1,200,000 PV panels on single-axis tracking systems. The panels measure approximately 2 meters by 1 meter and are rated between 335 and 445 Watts (i.e. maximum output). The total DC output rating of the facility is 408 MW. 
 PCUs: Inverters and pad-mounted transformers convert the DC output to AC power and step up the power to a 34.5 kV voltage. The capacity of the PCUs is up to 300 MW AC. 
 Collector Lines:  Approximately 55 miles of lines with 15 feeders. 
 Substation: A 34.5 kV/138 kV power collector substation is located on site. 

Construction of Badger Hollow Phase I started in 2020 and finished in November 2021. The project was delayed to allow the developer more time in managing the acquisition of the solar panels which was impacted by federal government changes to trade tariffs. 

A 5.7 mile, 138 kV generator tie lie was constructed to connect Badger Hollow facility with the existing electric transmission system. The tie line line cost $15.6 million and finished full construction in December 2021.

Construction of Badger Hollow Phase 2 (remaining 150 MW) has faced time delays and cost overruns due to impacts from COVID-19 as well as US government trade and tariff investigations into solar panel distributors and compliance on the sourcing of materials and labor to produce the panels. Phase 2 is expected to enter operations in early 2023.

Electricity Production 
During the first 12 months of operation (November 2020 through October 2021), Badger Hollow Phase 1 (150 MW) generated 192 GWh, approximately 0.3% of the total 2020 electricity generated in Wisconsin (62,584 GWh). The facility had an approximate annual capacity factor of 14% during that time. While presiding over the transfer of ownership stage, the PSC asked the owners to use an 18% capacity factor for their Electric Generation Expansion Analysis System (EGEAS) analysis.

References 

Photovoltaic power stations in the United States